Jauca is a barrio in the municipality of Jayuya, Puerto Rico. Its population in 2010 was 116. In 1948, Jauca was established from part of what was Jayuya Arriba (Jayuya barrio-pueblo).

See also

 List of communities in Puerto Rico

References

External links

Barrios of Jayuya, Puerto Rico